Don Martin (born September 17, 1949) is a former professional American football player who played defensive back for three seasons for the New England Patriots, Tampa Bay Buccaneers, and Kansas City Chiefs.

From 1998 to 2003, he was defensive quality control coach for the Oakland Raiders.

References

1949 births
Living people
American football cornerbacks
Atlantic Coast Football League players
New England Patriots players
Oakland Raiders coaches
Tampa Bay Buccaneers players
Yale Bulldogs football players
Kansas City Chiefs players
People from Carrollton, Missouri
Coaches of American football from  Missouri
Players of American football from  Missouri